Vasiliki Soupiadou (born 6 April 1978) is a Greek former footballer who played as a forward, and also played for the Greece women's national football team.

She competed at the 2004 Summer Olympics. At the club level, she played for Aegina.

See also
 Greece at the 2004 Summer Olympics

Notes

References

External links
 
 Profile at sports-reference.com

1978 births
Living people
Greek women's footballers
Place of birth missing (living people)
Footballers at the 2004 Summer Olympics
Olympic footballers of Greece
Women's association football forwards
Greece women's international footballers